Girdle of Gold is a 1952 British comedy film directed by Montgomery Tully and starring Esmond Knight, Maudie Edwards and Meredith Edwards. It was produced as a second feature for the lower half of a double bill. The film was shot at Walton Studios near London with location shooting taking place in the capital. The film's sets were designed by the art director Don Russell.

Synopsis
Griffiths a crafty undertaker in a small Welsh town hides £150 that he has kept from his wife in the lining girdle. Unknown to him she is about to elope with Evans the local milkman. Shortly before she does, she sells the girdle and buys a new one. The old one is sold on to newlywed Mary Rees who leaves for her honeymoon in London. This results in a frantic effort to recover it both by Griffiths, still after the stashed money, and Evans who wants to clear his name of accusations of theft.

Cast
 Esmond Knight as Evans the Milk
 Maudie Edwards as Mrs. Griffiths
 Meredith Edwards as	Griffiths the Hearse
 Petra Davies as Mary Rees
 Glyn Houston as Dai Thomas
 Tonie MacMillan as 	Mrs. Macey
 Kenneth Evans as Sergt. Mortimer
 Roger Maxwell as Chairman of Bench
 Humphrey Morton as 	Hotel Manager
 Ivan Craig as Hotel Detective
 Rigby Foster as 	Mr. Morgan
 Isabel George as 	Hotel Receptionist
 Mark Singleton as 	Waiter
 Denis Shaw as 	Choirmaster 
 Arthur Mullard as Court Police Officer 
 Jim O'Brady as Hotel Doorman
 Pat Ryan as 	Juror 
 Bill Shine as 	Juror

References

Bibliography
 Berry, David. Wales and Cinema: The First Hundred Years. University of Wales Press, 1994.

External links
 

1952 films
1952 comedy films
British comedy films
Films directed by Montgomery Tully
Films set in Wales
Films shot in London
Films set in London
Films shot at Nettlefold Studios
1950s English-language films
1950s British films